State Route 269 (SR 269) is a north–south state highway in the north central portion of the U.S. state of Ohio.

History
SR 269 was first designated in 1928 albeit on a much shorter route than it runs today. The original  route served as a cutoff to the Sandusky Bay Bridge on SR 2 and SR 12 (modern-day U.S. Route 6). In 1935, the route was extended south to end in Castalia at SR 12 (now on a different route than it was in 1928) and SR 101. Two years later, SR 269 was extended much further south through Bellevue to its current southern terminus at SR 4. The extension of SR 296 to SR 4 lead to the deletion of SR 296 as SR 269 was routed along the latter's entire route between SR 4 and Bellevue.

The route was extended north  after SR 2 was moved onto the new Thomas Edison Bridge over the Sandusky Bay. SR 269 utilized the old Bay Bridge and followed the former SR 240 to East Harbor State Park. Though the Bay Bridge was closed in 1985, SR 269 would still be officially designated on the approach routes until SR 269 was moved onto the SR 2 freeway, the Edison Bridge, and a former spur route of SR 269 by 1997.

Major junctions

References

269
Transportation in Huron County, Ohio
Transportation in Erie County, Ohio
Transportation in Ottawa County, Ohio